XMD is a classical molecular dynamics software designed to
simulate problems related to materials science. The code was
developed by Jon Rifkin of University of Connecticut and is being
distributed under GNU General Public License.

Source code is available in C and can be compiled using POSIX thread
functions to take advantage of multi-CPU computers.

See also 
Molecular design software

External links 
 XMD Homepage

Molecular dynamics software
Free science software
Free software programmed in C